Once Upon a Time is an album recorded by The Lettermen. It was released in 1962. This album, combined with their debut A Song for Young Love, was remastered and put out on CD. Jimmie Haskell was credited for the string arrangements and as the conductor. George Jerman was responsible for the album cover.

Track listing
"Time Was (Duerme)" (Gabriel Luna, Miguel Prado, Bob Russell)
"Young and Foolish" (Albert Hague, Arnold B. Horwitt)
"Lover's Beach" (Chuck Blore, Carl Prior, Euro Testi)
"Polka Dots and Moonbeams" (Johnny Burke, Jimmy Van Heusen)
"Evening Rain" (Leon Pober)
"Once Upon a Time" (Lee Adams, Charles Strouse)
"How Is Julie?" (Eddy Carroll, Barry DeVorzon)
"My Funny Valentine" (Richard Rodgers, Lorenz Hart)
"Remembering Last Summer" (Barry Mann, Cynthia Weil)
"Sixteen Reasons (Why I Love You)" (Bill Post)
"Summer's Gone" (Paul Anka)
"Turn Around, Look at Me" (Jerry Capehart)

References

1962 albums
The Lettermen albums
Capitol Records albums
Albums produced by Nick Venet
albums arranged by Jimmie Haskell